Slavo Kukić (born 21 July 1954) is a Bosnian PhD in Marxist sociology, professor of Sociology, Methodology of Scientific Research and Consumer Behavior at the Faculty of Economics of the University of Mostar, and teaches several undergraduate and graduate studies in Bosnia and Herzegovina and several postgraduate doctoral studies in Bosnia and neighboring countries. Kukić also writes opinion columns for a variety of media organisations, such as Al Jazeera Balkans.

Born in Posušje, he graduated from the Faculty of Political Sciences in Sarajevo in February 1977, from the Interdisciplinary Postgraduate Study of the University of Sarajevo in 1983, and at the Faculty of Political Science, in the Faculty of Political Science, in turn in the Faculty of Social Sciences in 1983.

He started his career in 1977 as an associate of the Municipal Assembly of Posušje. After that he was a director of the Marxist Centre. He was a professor in a high school in Posušje, and later a director. In 1987 he was elected President of the Executive Council of the Municipal Assembly of Posušje. In 1992 he was named a professor at the Faculty of Economics of the University of Mostar.

Attack
Kukić claimed that he was attacked with a baseball bat in 2014 due to his meeting with the controversial war criminal Dario Kordić. After the attack, Kukić claimed that he was not significantly injured. Federal Prime Minister Nermin Nikšić condemned the attack, calling it "another of a series of fascist outbursts".

Education
Department of Political Science, University of Sarajevo, 1977
Master of Science, University of Sarajevo, 1978-1983. 
Doctor of Sociological Sciences, University of Sarajevo, 1986.

References

External links

1954 births
Living people
People from Posušje
Croats of Bosnia and Herzegovina
Bosnia and Herzegovina sociologists
Bosnia and Herzegovina male academics
University of Sarajevo alumni
Economic sociologists